Dorcadion niveisparsum is a species of beetle in the family Cerambycidae. It was described by Thomson in 1865. It is known from Turkey and Armenia.

References

niveisparsum
Beetles described in 1865